Erishum I or Erišu(m) I (inscribed me-ri-šu, or mAPIN-ìš in later texts but always with an initial i in his own seal, inscriptions, and those of his immediate successors, “he has desired,”)  1974–1935 BC (middle chronology), son of Ilu-shuma, was the thirty-third ruler of Assyria to appear on the Assyrian King List. He reigned for forty years. One of two copies of the Assyrian King List which include him gives his reign length as only 30 years, but this contrasts with a complete list of his limmu, some 40, which are extant from tablets recovered at Karum Kanesh. He had titled himself both as, "Ashur is king, Erishum is vice-regent" and the, “Išši’ak Aššur”ki (“steward of Assur”), at a time when Assur was controlled by an oligarchy of the patriarchs of the prominent families and subject to the “judgment of the city”, or dīn alim. According to Veenhof, Erishum I’s reign marks the period when the institution of the annually appointed limmu (eponym) was introduced. The Assyrian King List observes of his immediate predecessors, “in all six kings known from bricks, whose limmu have not been marked/found”.

Biography

As Assur's merchant family firms vigorously pursued commercial expansion, Erišum I had established distant trading outposts in Anatolia referred to as karums. Karums were established along trade routes into Anatolia and included: Kanesh, Ankuwa, Hattusa, and eighteen other locations that have yet to be identified, some of which had been designated as “warbatums” (satellites of and subordinate to the karums') The markets traded in: tin (inscribed AN.NA, Akkadian: annukum), textiles, lapis lazuli, iron, antimony, copper, bronze, wool, and grain, in exchange for gold and silver. Around 23,000 tablets have been found at Kanesh spanning a period of 129 years from the thirtieth year of Erishum I’s reign through to that of Puzur-Ashur II or possibly Naram-Sin with the earliest from level II including copies of his inscriptions. These were discovered in 1948 with three other similar though fragmentary lists and two copies of an inscription of Erishum I detailing the regulations concerning the administration of justice in Assur, including the possibility of plaintiffs to obtain a rābiṣum (attorney) to represent them:

Following the example set by Erishum I's father (Ilu-shuma), he had proclaimed tax exemptions, or as Michael Hudson has interpreted, "Erishum I proclaimed a remission of debts payable in silver, gold, copper, tin, barley, wool, down to chaff." This appears in an inscription on one side of a large broken block of alabaster, apparently described as a ṭuppu. The shallow depression on its top has led some to identify it as a door socket.

His numerous contemporary inscriptions commemorate his building of the temple for Assur, called “Wild Bull” with its courtyard and two beer vats and the accompanying curses to those who would use them for their intended purposes. Erishum I’s other civic constructions included the temple of Ishtar and that of Adad. He had exercised eminent domain to clear an area from the Sheep Gate to the People’s Gate to make way for an enlargement of the city wall, so that he could boast that “I made a wall higher than the wall my father had constructed.” His efforts had been recalled by the later kings Šamši-Adad I, in his rebuilding dedication, and Šulmanu-ašared I, who noted that 159 years had passed between Erishum I’s work and that of Shamsh-Adad I, and a further 580 years until his own when a fire had gutted it.

Limmu during Erishum I's reign

The following is a list of the annually-elected limmu from the first full year of Erishum I's reign until the year of his death c. 1935 BC (middle chronology):

1974 BC Šu-Ištar, son of Abila 
1973 BC Šukutum, son of Išuhum 
1972 BC Iddin-ilum, son of Kurub-Ištar 
1971 BC Šu-Anim, son of Isalia 
1970 BC Anah-ili, son of Kiki 
1969 BC Suitaya, son of Ir'ibum 
1968 BC Daya, son of Išuhum 
1967 BC Ili-ellat 
1966 BC Šamaš-t.ab 
1965 BC Agusa 
1964 BC Idnaya, son of Šudaya 
1963 BC Quqadum, son of Buzu 
1962 BC Puzur-Ištar, son of Bedaki 
1961 BC Laqip, son of Bab-idi 
1960 BC Šu-Laban, son of Kurub-Ištar 
1959 BC Šu-Belum, son of Išuhum 
1958 BC Nab-Suen, son of Šu-Ištar 
1957 BC Hadaya, son of Elali 
1956 BC Ennum-Aššur, son of Begaya 
1955 BC Ikunum, son of Šudaya 
1954 BC Is.mid-ili, son of  Idida 
1953 BC Buzutaya, son of Išuhum 
1952 BC Šu-Ištar, son of Amaya 
1951 BC Iddin-Aššur, son of the priest 
1950 BC Puzur-Aššur, the ghee maker 
1949 BC Quqadum, son of Buzu 
1948 BC Ibni-Adad, son of Susaya 
1947 BC Irišum, son of Adad-rabi 
1946 BC Minanum, son of Begaya 
1945 BC Iddin-Suen, son of Šalim-ahum 
1944 BC Puzur-Aššur, son of Idnaya 
1943 BC Šuli, son of Uphakum 
1942 BC Laqip, son of Zukua 
1941 BC Puzur-Ištar, son of Erisua 
1940 BC Aguwa, son of Adad-rabi 
1939 BC Šu-Suen, son of S.illia 
1938 BC Ennum-Aššur, son of Begaya 
1937 BC Enna-Suen, son of Pussanum 
1936 BC Ennanum, son of Uphakum 
1935 BC Buzi, son of Adad-rabi

See also

 Timeline of the Assyrian Empire
 Old Assyrian Empire
 List of Assyrian kings
 Assyrian continuity
 Assyrian people

Inscriptions

Notes

References

20th-century BC Assyrian kings